Oedipus Orca is a 1977 Italian sexploitation-thriller directed by Eriprando Visconti. It is a sequel to La Orca, filmed the same/next year.

Cast
Michele Placido: Michele
Rena Niehaus: Alice
Gabriele Ferzetti: Valerio, Alice's father
Carmen Scarpitta: Irene, Alice's mother
Miguel Bosé: Humberto, Alice's boyfriend

References

External links

Oedipus Orca at Variety Distribution

1977 films
1970s Italian-language films
Italian sexploitation films
Films directed by Eriprando Visconti
1970s erotic thriller films
Italian erotic thriller films
1970s Italian films